Victoria East was an electoral riding in Ontario, Canada. It was created in 1886 and was abolished in 1914 before the 1919 election.

Members of Provincial Parliament

References

Former provincial electoral districts of Ontario